Yang Xi (born 1956 in Anxin County) is a Chinese former volleyball player. She was a member of the Chinese national team that won gold at both the 1981 FIVB Women's World Cup and the 1982 FIVB Women's World Championship. She also won a silver medal at the 1978 Asian Games and a gold medal at the 1982 Asian Games, after which she retired.

In 1989 she began coaching the Western Kentucky Lady Toppers. She later became a businesswoman in the US. In 2012, she opened a school in Beijing which sought to incorporate western-style education with Chinese sports schools.

References

1956 births
Volleyball players from Hebei
People from Anxin County
Sportspeople from Baoding
Living people
Chinese women's volleyball players
Asian Games medalists in volleyball
Volleyball players at the 1978 Asian Games
Volleyball players at the 1982 Asian Games
Medalists at the 1978 Asian Games
Chinese emigrants to the United States
Medalists at the 1982 Asian Games
Asian Games gold medalists for China
Asian Games silver medalists for China
Chinese volleyball coaches
20th-century Chinese women